"Chains of Gold" is a song written Paul Kennerley, and recorded by American country music duo Sweethearts of the Rodeo.  It was released in April 1987 as the fourth single from the album Sweethearts of the Rodeo.  The song reached #4 on the Billboard Hot Country Singles & Tracks chart.

Chart performance

References

1987 singles
1986 songs
Sweethearts of the Rodeo songs
Songs written by Paul Kennerley
Song recordings produced by Steve Buckingham (record producer)
Columbia Records singles